In the 2015 European Diving Championships, the women's 3 metre synchro springboard event was won by the Italian team of Tania Cagnotto and Francesca Dallapé.

Medalists

Results

Green denotes finalists

2015 European Diving Championships
Euro